Progress, Oregon is a neighborhood in Washington County, Oregon, United States.  Originally an unincorporated community that stood apart from any city, most of Progress now lies within the city limits of either Tigard or Beaverton.  Other nearby communities include Garden Home and Metzger.

Progress is located in the area surrounding the intersection of Oregon Route 217, Oregon Route 210 (Scholls Ferry Road), and the unsigned Oregon Route 141 (Hall Boulevard).  Today, Scholls Ferry Road forms much of the boundary between Tigard and Beaverton.  The Progress area is home to Washington Square, a large, upscale shopping mall that opened in 1973–1974.

Progress is also located along the Tigard-Beaverton branch line, a rail line operated by Portland & Western Railroad, which currently provides freight service to Washington County.  This line is one of many rail lines in Oregon that formerly provided passenger service. With the opening of the Westside Express Service (WES) commuter-rail service in February 2009, passenger service returned to these tracks, in weekday peak periods only. The WES line's Hall/Nimbus station is located at the western edge of Progress.

Climate
This region experiences warm (sometimes hot) and dry summers, with no average monthly temperatures above 71.6 °F.  According to the Köppen Climate Classification system, Progress has a warm-summer Mediterranean climate, abbreviated "Csb" on climate maps.

See also
Sawyer's
View-Master factory supply well

References

Oregon Geographic Names

Neighborhoods in Oregon
Beaverton, Oregon
Tigard, Oregon